Alison Newman (born 25 January 1968) is a British actress, best known for her role in the hit ITV1 television series Footballers' Wives as Hazel Bailey, and as DCI Samantha Keeble in the BBC soap opera EastEnders.

Biography 
Alison Newman was born in Bournemouth, Hampshire, to David and Jenny Newman. She has one sister called Sarah. Both her parents were schoolteachers who encouraged her to take up acting as a hobby but discouraged her from attending stage school when she was younger, a decision she subsequently agreed was probably sensible. Instead, she joined the National Youth Theatre when she was sixteen. Her father died in October 2002, while she was filming the second series of Footballers' Wives. The producers allowed her to take time off from filming some of her last scenes in the series finale so she could be with her family.

Despite studying drama at the University of Manchester Alison Newman did not work as an actress for almost ten years after graduating. She says that she hated the experience of being at drama school and lost her confidence. During this time, she worked in a variety of professions, including publishing, catering, barwork and spent a number of years working in the music industry.

She returned to acting when she was almost 30 after being offered a part in a play written by Anthony Neilson, with whom she had previously worked as an assistant director. This was followed by a role playing a psychotic serial killer in Touching Evil III (1999) with Robson Green (who she would later appear with in RocketMan), and the film Butterfly Collectors (1999), alongside Pete Postlethwaite.

Footballers Wives 
In 2002, Newman was cast in the role of ruthless lesbian football agent, and later club chair, Hazel Bailey in Footballers Wives. Newman was allegedly awarded the role on the strength of a two-episode guest appearance in the series Bad Girls, in which she played Renee Williams who set out to secure revenge on nemesis Top Dog Yvonne Atkins (Linda Henry). Both programmes were made by Shed Productions. The part of Hazel Bailey required Newman to have her naturally blonde hair dyed red. Newman left the show at the end of series 4, when her character decided to return to sports representation, after becoming romantically involved with a professional tennis player.

Other work 
After Footballers Wives, Newman played Diane Scott in Rocket Man for BBC One in the autumn of 2005. In 2008, she appeared as Lynette Hopkins in Rock Rivals, another Shed Productions drama for ITV1, and later that year she appeared as Detective Inspector Samantha Keeble in several episodes of the BBC soap EastEnders. She played the part of a back-street abortionist in an episode of the popular BBC One drama Call the Midwife, as well as appearing in the short film Father in 2013. In July 2014 Newman resumed the role of DI Samantha Keeble in EastEnders when her character was put in charge of the Lucy Beale murder case. She departed the role again in June 2016. She returned to the series once again in January 2022 and is currently still in the role. 

Newman has extensive theatre experience, including Loveplay by Moira Buffini; Luminosity by Nick Stafford; Night of the Soul by David Farr and The Big Lie by Anthony Neilson, all for the RSC, as well as The Censor and The Lying Kind, both by Anthony Neilson, for the Royal Court Theatre, London.  Between 2003 and 2006, she appeared in Vagina Monologues, both on tour and in the West End. Her most recent theatre work was in Two Women, by Martina Cole, and performed at the Theatre Royal Stratford East between February and March 2010.

She co-created the TV series Harlots with Moira Buffini.

Personal life 
Newman is married to Hugh Williams, a graphic designer. They live in Glasgow.

Filmography

Television

Film

Theatre

References

External links

Alison Newman on Twitter
Footballers Wives: Official Site

English television actresses
1968 births
Living people
Actresses from Dorset
Alumni of the University of Manchester
National Youth Theatre members